Devineni Uma Maheswara Rao, better known as Uma, is a politician in the state of Andhra Pradesh, India. He was elected to the Andhra Pradesh Legislative Assembly for four terms (20 years), in 1999, 2004, 2009 and 2014. Elected first in 1999 from the Nandigama Constituency, and then in 2009 and 2014 he was elected from the Mylavaram Constituency. He is the president of the Krishna District Telugu Desam Party. Uma is known for his articulate speeches in the Andhra Pradesh Assembly and for leading several agitations in support of farmers.

References

1959 births
Living people
Andhra Pradesh MLAs 2009–2014
Andhra Pradesh MLAs 2014–2019
Third N. Chandrababu Naidu Cabinet (2014–2019)
State cabinet ministers of Andhra Pradesh
Telugu Desam Party politicians
Telugu politicians